Chatan is an ancient Okinawan surname and this surname is read Kitatani in Japanese nowadays. Notable people with the surname include:
Chatan Chōai (1650–1719), prince of Ryukyu Kingdom, Japan
Chatan Chōchō (1607–1667), bureaucrat of Ryukyu Kingdom, Japan
Chatan Chōki (1703–1739), prince of Ryukyu Kingdom, Japan
Chatan Yara (1668–1756), Ryukyuan martial artist

Japanese-language surnames
Okinawan surnames